The 1965 San Jose State Spartans football team represented San Jose State College during the 1965 NCAA University Division football season.

San Jose State played as an Independent in 1965. The team was led by first-year head coach Harry Anderson, and played home games at Spartan Stadium in San Jose, California. The Spartans finished the 1965 season with a record of five wins and five losses (5–5). Overall, the team was outscored by its opponents 184–192 for the season.

Schedule

Team players in the NFL/AFL
The following San Jose State players were selected in the 1966 NFL Draft.

The following San Jose State players were selected in the 1966 AFL Draft.

The following finished their San Jose State career in 1965, were not drafted, but played in the AFL.

Notes

References

San Jose State
San Jose State Spartans football seasons
San Jose State Spartans football